Bumar-Labedy is an arms manufacturer based in the Polish part of Upper Silesia. It is a division of the Polish Armaments Group.

In 2010 the firm won the contract to build Hitfist OWS remote-controlled turrets for Polish armored vehicles.

In 2016 the firm was awarded the contract to refit Poland's Leopard 2 tanks.

In 2017 the firm was contracted to refit Poland's T-72 tanks.

References

Defence companies of Poland
Firearm manufacturers of Poland
Polish brands
Weapons manufacturing companies
Gliwice